Jeremy Coller (born 17 May 1958) is a British businessman and philanthropist. He is the founder, chief investment officer and chairman of Coller Capital. Known as "The Godfather of Secondaries", Coller is one of Europe's best-known alternative investors, specialising in buying second-hand stakes in private equity funds.

He is chairman of the Jeremy Coller Foundation, his vehicle for philanthropic activities. He is Deputy Chair of Tel Aviv University and an advisory board member of the university's Coller School of Management. He is a member of the Advisory Council of The Elders, the international peace and human rights NGO founded by Nelson Mandela.

In 2019 the Sunday Times Rich List gave Coller's net worth to be £320 million.

Early life and education
Coller was born in London on 17 May 1958. He became vegetarian at the age of 12.

He attended Carmel College and holds a master's degree in Philosophy from the University of Sussex and a BSc (Hons) in Management Sciences from Manchester University School of Management. He took the Diplome Cours de Civilisation at the Sorbonne in Paris.

After building a successful career in private equity, Coller was awarded an Honorary Fellowship by London Business School in 2011 and in 2013, received an Honorary Doctorate from Tel Aviv University.

Business career
Coller's early career was spent as Head of Equity Research at Fidelity International. He then joined ICI Pension Plan as a sector fund manager, before becoming a venture and buyout manager. In this role, Coller pioneered the purchase of secondary positions in private equity and became the first investor in VCFA.

In 1990, he started the first European private equity secondaries fund. Since then, Coller Capital has become a globally recognised leader in the private equity secondaries market and Coller is recognised for leading the industrialisation of private equity secondaries. His notable acquisitions include technology incubators formerly owned by BT, Lucent Bell Labs and the United Kingdom Atomic Energy Authority.

He is Chief Investment Officer and Managing Partner of Coller Capital, which has completed some of the largest transactions in the private equity secondary market. The firm employs over 220 people, and is headquartered in London, with additional offices in New York City, Hong Kong and Korea. In January 2021, the firm closed Coller International Partners VIII, with committed capital (including co-investment vehicles) of just over $9 billion and backing from over 200 of the world's leading institutional investors. In February 2022 the firm closed Coller Credit Opportunities I, with committed capital (including co-investment vehicles) of c.$1.4 billion and backing from over 30 institutional investors.

Coller promotes entrepreneurship in the UK and worldwide, offering frequent support for the commercialisation of innovative ideas.

Philanthropy 
The Jeremy Coller Foundation is a strategic grant-making organisation, focused on two primary programme areas: ending factory farming and improving venture and management education.

The Foundation also funds and supports the work of The Elders, where Coller has been a member of the Advisory Council since 2012.

Venture and management education

Coller Institute of Private Equity at London Business School 
The Coller Institute of Private Equity at London Business School (2008–2016) sprang from a significant donation to London Business School by the Jeremy Coller Foundation in 2008.

The Institute focused on private equity education and research, and was influential in building bridges between academia and the global private equity industry. The institute also published Private Equity Findings, a digest of international private equity-related research. (This publication is now published directly by Coller Capital.)

Coller Institute of Venture at Tel Aviv University 
The Coller Institute of Venture was established at Tel Aviv University in 2013, with a mission to advance the venture ecosystem globally. The Institute pursues three objectives:

 To identify the conditions that will lead to compelling venture capital returns for long-term capital providers (e.g., pension plans, charitable foundations, and sovereign wealth funds)
 To investigate and communicate best practice in 'technology translation' – the creation of new businesses from IP owned by governments, universities and corporates
 To promote innovation in venture policy-making and planning, encouraging governments to adopt best practices in legal frameworks, fiscal incentives, behavioural economics, and other areas of public policy.

The Institute produces the Coller Venture Review (previously known as Venture Findings) – a publication aimed at deepening understanding of innovation and the venture ecosystem.

Coller School of Management, at Tel Aviv University 
The Coller School of Management at Tel Aviv University was established in 2016, following a major donation from the Jeremy Coller Foundation. The donation renamed, and boosted the capacities of, Israel's leading business school, which has been educating undergraduates, graduates, business managers, and entrepreneurs for over 50 years.

The Coller School is one of the world's leading management schools in the area of venture and entrepreneurship; its graduates are more successful at attracting venture capital funding than those of many other well-known business schools – ranking the Coller School number 11 globally in this area.

The Jeremy Coller Foundation funds the School to recruit fresh faculty, expand its research, and diversify and internationalise its student body.

The Coller School of Management aspires to be one of the leading places in the world for aspiring innovators to build the skills, the know-how, and the networks for success in the world of venture – a mission that will be greatly facilitated by the School's base in Tel Aviv, which has been recognised by Startup Genome as having the world's best start-up ecosystem outside Silicon Valley.

The School hosts the Coller Startup Competition, a $100,000 prize awarded annually to startups focused on the future of food, specifically on replacing animals in the human food supply chain. The 2019 winner was Solutum Ltd, which develops water-soluble plastic-like bags.

Ending factory farming 
The Jeremy Coller Foundation looks at the consequences of factory farming for global sustainability.

FAIRR (Farm Animal Investment Risk & Return) Initiative 
FAIRR is a collaborative investor network that raises awareness of the material ESG risks and opportunities caused by intensive livestock production. Launched by the Jeremy Coller Foundation in 2015, FAIRR believes that intensive livestock production poses material risks to the global financial system and hinders sustainable development. Its mission is to build a global network of investors who are focused and engaged on the risks and opportunities linked to animal factory farming. As of August 2019, FAIRR's membership and wider supporting network comprises institutional investors managing over $16 trillion in combined assets. FAIRR also runs collaborative investor engagements with global food companies to improve performance on selected ESG issues in the sector.

Human health 
The Foundation is supporting activities to address the human health consequences of factory farming, with a focus on one of the most pressing public health issues today: antibiotic resistance.

The Foundation coordinates epidemiological research with governments and the public and private sectors to provide an evidential basis for the link between antibiotic misuse on factory farms and antibiotic resistance in humans, to project future resistance patterns, and to contribute to a global public health action plan. In parallel, the Foundation works with the Alliance to Save Our Antibiotics and other NGOs to promote legislation for the appropriate use of antibiotics in farm animals.

Animal welfare 
The Foundation seeks to highlight the animal welfare impacts of factory farming. As concern among consumers about the way in which animals are treated in the course of producing meat, dairy or egg products increases, farm animal welfare is also growing in importance for investors in the food industry. Higher standards of welfare are not only important to meeting consumer expectations but can also have a beneficial effect on business efficiency, profitability and long-term market value when health risks are taken into account.

As part of this programme, the Foundation supports the Business Benchmark on Farm Animal Welfare (BBFAW), a tool for investors to assess corporate animal welfare policies and performance and to integrate this into their investment decision making and engagement.

Coller Prize for Interspecies Conversation 
In July 2020, Coller announced the Coller Prize for Interspecies Conversation, a $1m award in support of research into AI-augmented human-animal communication. The prize was announced by Interspecies I/O, a forum of leading figures in inter-species communication; its members include Peter Gabriel, Vint Cerf, Diana Reiss and Neil Gershenfeld. At the same forum, he also announced the Coller Hall of Fame and Young Leaders Circle, for leading interspecies thinkers, as well as the creation of a digital hub in support of interspecies research.

Commenting on advances in machine learning, Coller said his aim was to  “…seek out the conversation algorithm that will unlock in ourselves a greater sense of respect for those other animals with whom we share our planet, so we no longer see them simply as objects and possessions.”

Honours and awards
Coller has won numerous awards for his contribution to the private equity and venture capital industries. These include:

 One of the Most Influential People in Private Equity by Financial News in 2010, 2011, 2012 and 2013.
 Being voted Private Equity Personality of the Decade by Financial News (2013)
 Coller was named to Financial News's Europe's 50 Most Influential People list in 2018 and 2020.
 Financial News' European Personality of the Decade for his role in industrialising the secondaries market.

Coller received an Honorary Doctorate from Tel Aviv University in 2013, for guiding the evolution of private equity as an asset class, and his commitment to the worldwide teaching of research in entrepreneurship and innovation. In 2011, he received an Honorary Fellowship from London Business School. In 2008, he received an Outstanding Alumnus Award from the University of Manchester.

Financial News has over several years voted Coller one of the most influential people in private equity and in 2013, named him its Private Equity Personality of the Decade.

Publications 
Coller's book Splendidly Unreasonable Inventors: The Lives, Loves, and Deaths of 30 Pioneers Who Changed the World was published in 2008.

References

Private equity and venture capital investors
British businesspeople
Alumni of the University of Sussex
Alumni of the University of Manchester
University of Paris alumni
Private equity secondary market
Living people
1958 births
British expatriates in France